The Gift Supreme is a 1920 American silent drama film starring Bernard Durning, Seena Owen, Lon Chaney (in a villainous bit role) and Tully Marshall. The film was directed by Ollie Sellers and based on the 1916 novel of the same name by George Allan England. Most sources do not state who wrote the screenplay, although it was probably written by Ollie Sellers. The assistant director was Justin McKlosky. The supporting cast includes Melbourne MacDowell, Eugenie Besserer, Jack Curtis, Anna Dodge and Claire McDowell. Some sources state the film was released on April 12, 1920, but the majority say May 9.

Plot
Bradford Vinton (Bernard Durning) is disinherited by his wealthy father, Eliot Vinton, for refusing to end his friendship with Sylvia Alden (Seen Owen), a beautiful young missionary and singer from Boggs Court, a London slum. Eliot even tries to have the young girl arrested on a false charge of prostitution, for which Bradford angrily excoriates the old man. When Bradford goes to tell Sylvia he has been disinherited, he finds that she has already left town.

Bradford opens a cheap restaurant in the area to feed the homeless and one night, a gangster named Merney Stagg (Lon Chaney) stabs him in a drunken rage. He later learns it was Merney Stagg who helped his father to frame Sylvia.

Bradford is rushed to a hospital, where the doctors say only an immediate blood transfusion can save his life. Sylvia, who is working as a nurse there, immediately volunteers to donate her blood, giving him "the Gift Supreme". When Eliot sees how much she loves his son, he grants them permission to marry.

Cast
 Bernard Durning as Bradford Chandler Vinton 
 Seena Owen as Sylvia Alden
 Melbourne MacDowell as Eliot Vinton
 Tully Marshall as Irving Stagg
 Eugenie Besserer as Martha Vinton
 Lon Chaney as Merney Stagg, gangster
 Jack Curtis as Muggs Rafferty
 Anna Dodge as Mrs. Wesson
 Claire McDowell as Lalia Graun
 Scott McKee 
 Richard (Dick) Morris as Dopey Dan

Reception
"The story...is interpreted by a cast of well-known andcapable players... Lon Chaney and Tully Marshall play up to the standard of former triumphs." ---Moving Picture World

"As an underworld melodrama, (the film) passes average muster. It would have been possible, with the material in this story, to make a much stronger picture had the director hung his sequences together more compactly and dramatically.... Telly Marshall, Lon Chaney and Jack Curtis are the principal figures in the corps of assisting players and the work that each does stands out through sheer skill." ---Wid's Film Daily

"While 'old stuff' in the main, without any distinguishing high lights either in production, handling or cast, it is interesting...Of the character actors, Lon Chaney takes all the honors with Tully Marshall, of course, doing a small role in excellent fashion. The balance of the cast is acceptable.....The production is in six reels and runs a trifle too long." ---Variety

"The scenario writers have been eating raw meat again. If you are a little tired of slick, nice-mannered and well-dressed society plays, go to see THE GIFT SUPREME and learn that life still runs wild in some places." ---Photoplay

Current Status
An incomplete print (reel one of six) survives and is preserved in a private collection. Since the film was released to the 16mm rental market in the 1920's, it is possible that a complete print may survive in the hands of a private collector somewhere, but so far only reel one has surfaced.

A brief clip from the film was used in the Kino produced 1995 documentary Lon Chaney: Behind the Mask.

Notes

References

External links
 
 (first reel)

1920 films
1920 drama films
Silent American drama films
American silent feature films
American black-and-white films
Films based on American novels
Films set in London
American independent films
Lost American films
1920 lost films
Lost drama films
1920s independent films
Films directed by Oliver L. Sellers
1920s American films